Jody Letson (born January 1, 1949) is an American politician who served in the Alabama House of Representatives from the 7th district from 1994 to 2010.

References

1949 births
Living people
Democratic Party members of the Alabama House of Representatives